Gainesville Regional Airport  is a public airport three miles northeast of Gainesville, in Alachua County, Florida, United States. It is owned by Gainesville-Alachua Co. Auth. The National Plan of Integrated Airport Systems for 2011–2015 categorized it as a primary commercial service airport (more than 10,000 enplanements per year).

Gainesville Regional Airport had 177,282 passenger boardings (enplanements) in calendar year 2011 and 159,499 enplanements in 2010. They also had 217,355 passenger boardings (enplanements) in 2015, more than 2% higher than 2014.

Gainesville Regional Airport had 558,246 passengers in 2019.

The airport annually hosts the Gator Fly In at the general aviation facilities. The event includes military aircraft displays, a classic car show, food trucks, live music, and aircraft rides aboard a Ford Tri-motor, a Cessna 172, and on helicopters.

History

Construction of the airport began in April 1940 as a Works Project Administration project. In 1941 initial construction was completed.  Upon conclusion of the construction by the United States Army Corps of Engineers, the facility was known as the Alachua Army Airfield and was used by the Army Air Corps and the Army Air Forces.

The airfield was declared surplus in September 1945 and turned over to the Army Corps of Engineers on October 1, 1946. The War Assets Administration deeded the facility to the city of Gainesville in 1948 as a civil airport. The field was known as John R. Alison Airport or Gainesville Municipal Airport; the city operated, maintained, and improved the airport, which was renamed the Gainesville Regional Airport in October 1977. The airline terminal was dedicated to John R. Alison in 1979.

Eastern Airlines served Gainesville beginning in the 1950s, with flights to Tallahassee, Jacksonville and Ocala, eventually offering nonstop flights to Atlanta and Miami by the 1970s.  Eastern served Gainesville until its bankruptcy in 1991 and was consistently a profitable destination for the company. Air Florida served Gainesville in the late 1970s and early 1980s, with flights to Miami, Tampa and Ocala.

In 1986 the State Legislature passed a bill that established the Airport as the Gainesville-Alachua County Regional Airport Authority. The Airport Authority has nine board members, five selected by the City of Gainesville, three by the Governor and one by Alachua County, and continues to oversee the Airport.

On October 31, 2004 Gainesville Regional Airport hosted Air Force One during George W. Bush's re-election campaign. 17,000 people attended the event. 

In recent years the Airport has substantially completed several projects: the refurbishment of its primary runway (11/29), piping of an open ditch parallel to that runway, and completion of two phases of the Terminal Renovation project. Three passenger boarding bridges have been installed.

Eclipse Aviation, maker of the Eclipse 500, operated its first factory service center in Gainesville until the company declared bankruptcy in 2009. In 2012 Silver Airways moved its maintenance facilities from Ft. Lauderdale into the existing Eclipse Aviation facility. Silver provides commercial airline service to several destinations around Florida and Bahamas. In April 2015 Silver airways moved its maintenance to Orlando International.

The control tower operates 645a to 1030p daily. After the passing of Gainesville native Tom Petty on October 2, 2017, a change.org petition was started to have the airport renamed "Tom Petty - Gainesville Regional Airport".

In 2021 Gainesville Regional Airport added a 15,200 square-foot expansion onto their terminal. The new expansion adds a mother lactation room, a pet relief area, two new gates, hundreds of new seats with charging ports, a departure and arrival board, and an area for a food/store vendor. In addition to the expansion, the existing terminal was given a renovation. The project cost $16 million dollars that was funded by a $12 million dollar grant from the FAA. Plans to add a parking structure are currently in discussion, with immediate plans to construct a temporary parking lot to alleviate capacity issues.

Facilities

In the year ending September 30, 2011 the airport had 70,876 aircraft operations, average 366 per day: 73% general aviation, 8% air taxi, 8% military and 1% airline. 185 aircraft are based at the airport: 83% single-engine, 9% multi-engine, 4% jet and 4% helicopter.

Gainesville Regional Airport has one full service FBO, University Air Center. There were two, Gulf Atlantic Airways and Flight Line.  Flight Line's contract with the airport authority expired and Gulf Atlantic became University Air Center.  University Air Center has a pilots lounge with TV, snack machines, aircraft rentals and charters, flight instruction, and fuel.
Gainesville Regional Airport's terminal has 5 gates. Gates 4 and 5 are used by American Eagle. Gates 1 and 2 are used by Delta Air Lines and Delta Connection. The airport terminal has a snack bar and a gift shop, operated by Tailwind. The airport's ground transportation is served by taxis; rental car companies; an RTS bus stop serving routes 25, 26, and 39; and hotel shuttle buses. Renovations slated to be completed by 2021 will add 2 additional gates to the facility, in addition to a large baggage screening area, and additional parking. The terminal expansion and improvement project was completed July 29, 2021, and added additional restrooms, additional food and beverage areas, a lactation room, a chapel, and a pet relief area, in addition to 2 additional gates

In August 2021, the Gainesville City Commission approved FAA grants to cover engineering costs for improvements to the apron and taxiway and costs incurred during the COVID-19 pandemic.

Airlines and destinations

Statistics

Total passengers

Top destinations

Accidents and incidents

On May 31, 2018, Allegiant Air Flight 1304 made an emergency landing due to a medical emergency involving the pilot. On the flight from Cincinnati to Punta Gorda the pilot had a seizure and the flight diverted to Gainesville. The pilot was immediately brought to the hospital. There were no other injuries or deaths.

References
https://web.archive.org/web/20150407100148/http://www.expressjet.com/wp-content/uploads/routemaps/2015/ExpressJet_DeltaSystem(Apr15).pdf

External links

 Gainesville Regional Airport (official site)
  brochure from CFASPP
 
 

Airports in Florida
Airports established in 1941
Transportation buildings and structures in Alachua County, Florida
1941 establishments in Florida